Tripteridia fletcheri is a moth in the family Geometridae. It is found on Borneo and possibly in New Guinea. The habitat consists of mountainous areas.

References

Moths described in 1976
Tripteridia